Sophie Hitchon (born 11 July 1991) is a retired British hammer thrower. She is the British record-holder with a throw of 74.54 metres, set when winning the Olympic bronze medal at the 2016 Rio Games, Great Britain's first ever Olympic medal in the event. She also reached the hammer final at the 2012 London Olympics, and is the 2010 World Junior Champion, the 2013 European U23 Champion, and the 2014 Commonwealth Games bronze medallist.

Early life
Hitchon was born in Burnley, Lancashire, and attended Wellfield Church Primary School, Ivy Bank Business and Enterprise College and Thomas Whitham Sixth Form. She is studying for a BSc in Business and Sport Management from the University of Hertfordshire. Hitchon practiced ballet between the ages of 4 and 14 and credits it for teaching dedication to sport.

Achievements
In April 2007, Hitchon set a new UK Under 17 Women's record with a throw of 49.61m at the Kingston-upon-Hull AC Open meeting.
The previous record was 48.94m achieved by Frances Miller of Elgin Harriers at the 2001 IAAF World Youth Championships in Debrecen, Hungary.

In March 2008, at the age of 16, Hitchon set a new junior record with a throw of 59.74m at the UK Throws event in Birmingham, followed by a 59.49m throw at the Blackpool Open Meeting the same weekend.

In July 2009, Hitchon won bronze in the hammer at the European Junior Championships. In doing so she also improved her own national junior record to 63.18m and took Britain's first ever European Junior medal in the women's hammer.

A year later, Hitchon was captain of the UK women's team at the IAAF World Junior Championships (Moncton, Canada, 19–25 July), as well as remaining the UK junior hammer record holder.

In July 2011, Hitchon represented the UK in the European Under-23 Championships in Ostrava, Czech Republic (14–17 July), taking the bronze medal.

At the 2014 Commonwealth Games in Glasgow, Hitchon achieved a bronze medal in the women's Hammer throw with a distance of 68.72m. This was her first success at a senior level championship.

At the 2016 Rio Olympics, Hitchon achieved a bronze medal in the women's hammer throw with a distance of 74.54 metres on her final attempt, setting a new GB record in the process.  It also made her the first British hammer thrower to win an Olympic medal and ended a 28-year Olympic medal drought for GB in women's field events since Fatima Whitbread's silver at Seoul in 1988.

Hitchon announced her retirement in May 2021.

International competitions

q = in qualifying

References

External links
 

1991 births
Living people
Sportspeople from Burnley
English female hammer throwers
British female hammer throwers
Olympic female hammer throwers
Olympic athletes of Great Britain
Olympic bronze medallists for Great Britain
Olympic bronze medalists in athletics (track and field)
Athletes (track and field) at the 2012 Summer Olympics
Athletes (track and field) at the 2016 Summer Olympics
Medalists at the 2016 Summer Olympics
Commonwealth Games bronze medallists for England
Commonwealth Games medallists in athletics
Athletes (track and field) at the 2014 Commonwealth Games
Athletes (track and field) at the 2018 Commonwealth Games
World Athletics Championships athletes for Great Britain
British Athletics Championships winners
Medallists at the 2014 Commonwealth Games